HV 11417 is a candidate Thorne–Żytkow object, put forward in a paper by Emma Beasor and collaborators. The paper also claims that another candidate for the Thorne–Żytkow object, HV 2112, was not a Thorne–Żytkow object because it seemingly possessed no strange quality that would label it as a Thorne–Żytkow object. HV 11417 has since been identified as a likely foreground halo star.

References

Tucana (constellation)
Neutron stars
M-type supergiants
Extragalactic stars
Stars in the Small Magellanic Cloud
PMMR objects
TIC objects